The Ghana International is an international badminton tournament, which was planned to be hosted by Badminton Association of Ghana after a long break for the first time in 2017 since 1989. However, the tournament was cancelled. The tournament had been scheduled to be held from 20–23 July 2017 and was graded as International Series, a Level 4 badminton tournament.

Previous winners

References

Badminton tournaments
Sports competitions in Ghana
Badminton in Ghana